Franchise: The Golden Arches in Black America is a book by Marcia Chatelain. It was awarded the 2021 Pulitzer Prize for History.

References 

Pulitzer Prize for History-winning works
Boni & Liveright books
2020 non-fiction books